Copperas Cove Independent School District is a public school district based in Copperas Cove, Texas (USA).

Located in Coryell County, a small portion of the district extends into Bell County.

In 2009, the school district was rated "recognized" by the Texas Education Agency.

References

External links
Copperas Cove ISD

School districts in Coryell County, Texas
School districts in Bell County, Texas